Eryphanis automedon, the Automedon giant owl, is a species of butterfly belonging to the family Nymphalidae.

Description
In males the dorsal sides of the wings show night blue iridescent patches, extending from submedial to postmedial areas, with well defined borders separating the non-iridescent sections. Ventral sides vary from faded brown to caramel color, with various eyespots. The female wingspan is slightly larger, with a slightly different wing color pattern.

This butterfly can live up to six weeks and flies in the dark forests of Latin America. It is a fast flying butterfly. The caterpillars are cryptically colored and feed at night on Poaceae host plants (mainly bamboo leaves), of which the elongated chrysalis mimics the appearance of a dried leaf.

Distribution
This butterfly is native to South America.

Subspecies
The following subspecies are recognized:
Eryphanis automedon automedon (Suriname)
Eryphanis automedon lycomedon (C. & R. Felder, 1862) (Guatemala and Costa Rica to Colombia)
Eryphanis automedon amphimedon (C. & R. Felder, 1867) (Brazil)
Eryphanis automedon tristis Staudinger, 1887 (Peru)
Eryphanis automedon novicia Stichel, 1904 (Ecuador)
Eryphanis automedon cheiremon Fruhstorfer, 1912 (Bolivia)
Eryphanis automedon spintharus Fruhstorfer, 1912 (Colombia)

References

 Carla M. Penz - Phylogenetic Revision of Eryphanis Boisduval, with a Description of a New Species from Ecuador (Lepidoptera, Nymphalidae) - Insecta Mundi, 2008
 BioLib.cz
 Tree of Life
 Catalogue of Life
  Retrieved April 20, 2018.

External links
 Neotropical Butterflies

Morphinae
Nymphalidae of South America
Butterflies described in 1775
Fauna of Brazil
Taxa named by Pieter Cramer